Arunoday Singh is an Indian actor. He made his debut with Sikandar (2009). He has appeared in films like Aisha (2010), Yeh Saali Zindagi (2011), Jism 2 (2012), Main Tera Hero (2014), Mr X (2015), Mohenjo Daro (2016) and Blackmail (2018). and Khakee 2 (2025) He also appeared in the web series Apaharan (2018-2022).

Early life and background 
Singh is the grandson of Arjun Singh, an Indian politician who was the Chief Minister of Madhya Pradesh, and son of Ajay Singh (Rahul  bhaiya) leader of opposition in Madhya Pradesh State assembly.

He is an alumnus of Brandeis University, having previously been educated at a boarding school in Kodaikanal, where he performed in school plays. According to him, it was after watching actor Marlon Brando in On the Waterfront (1954) that he decided to become an actor. After his graduation, he did a few courses in the New York Film Academy, and thereafter enrolled in the Acting Studio in New York, during the period he also performed in plays.

Career
After finishing his studies he started giving auditions, and finally made his debut with Sikandar (2009), directed by Piyush Jha, playing a Kashmiri terrorist. His second film was the ensemble romantic comedy-drama Aisha (2010), an adaptation of the novel Emma by Jane Austen directed by Rajshree Ojha, co-starring Sonam Kapoor, Abhay Deol, Ira Dubey, Cyrus Sahukar, Amrita Puri, Anand Tiwari and Lisa Haydon; he portrayed Dhruv Singh, a flirtatious playboy. Also in the same year, he appeared in Vinay Shukla's take on gender and sexuality in Mirch, through a collage of five stories, with Konkana Sen Sharma Raima Sen, where he played the central character of a struggling film director.
 
In 2011, he acted alongside Irrfan Khan and Aditi Rao Hydari, another newcomer in Sudhir Mishra's Yeh Saali Zindagi (2011). His performance earned him a nomination for Best Actor in a Supporting Role at the 18th Screen Awards. He next appeared in Jism 2 opposite Sunny Leone and Randeep Hooda. In 2014 he appeared in David Dhawan's comedy film Main Tera Hero opposite Varun Dhawan, Ileana D'Cruz and Nargis Fakhri; and the supernatural thriller film Pizza. His next release was Mr. X as Dr. Steve Rhodes opposite Emraan Hashmi and Amyra Dastur. In 2016, Singh appeared in Ashutosh Gowariker's epic-adventure romance  film Mohenjo Daro, alongside Hrithik Roshan and Pooja Hegde.

Personal life
On December 13, 2016, he tied the knot with LeeAnn Elton, who he met three years previously in Goa. Lee owns a cafe in Goa. They divorced in 2019.

Filmography

Web series

References

External links

 
 

1983 births
Living people
Indian male film actors
Male actors in Hindi cinema
Brandeis University alumni
New York Film Academy alumni
People from Bhopal district